Stephen Case Cookus (born October 6, 1995) is an American football quarterback for the Philadelphia Stars of the United States Football League (USFL). As a true freshman at Northern Arizona University, he was named the recipient of the 2015 Jerry Rice Award and the STATS FCS Freshman Player of the Year Award, both of which are awarded to the most outstanding freshman player in the NCAA Division I Football Championship Subdivision. He holds the record for most combined passing and rushing touchdowns in a USFL game with 5, which he accomplished in a game vs the Michigan Panthers on June 5, 2022.

College career

2015
As a true freshman, Cookus began the season as the starting quarterback. After throwing for 3,111 yards and 37 touchdowns, he was named Freshman of the Year and was the winner of the Jerry Rice Award, which is given to the most outstanding freshman in the Football Championship Subdivision. He was also named to the All-Big Sky First-team.

2016
In the 2016 season, Cookus started the first four games of the season before suffering a season-ending shoulder injury against Eastern Washington on September 24. Against New Mexico Highlands, he tied school record of seven touchdown passes in a single game. For the season, he threw for 1,173 passing yards with 13 touchdowns and one interception.

2017
Cookus made a comeback season in 2017. His best game came against Cal Poly where he completed 35 of 46 passes for 406 yards and four touchdowns. For the season, he threw 275 passes on 474 attempts for 3,413 yards with 22 touchdowns and 6 interceptions. Cookus took Northern Arizona to the playoffs, but lost 41–20 in the first round to San Diego after throwing 22 of 41 for 178 yards, a touchdown, and an interception. Against Montana, Cookus was ejected for targeting after throwing a downfield block, a very rare occurrence since targeting is almost exclusively called against defensive players.

2018
During the second game of the season against Eastern Washington, Cookus once again injured his shoulder while trying to run the ball. He finished the season completing 24 passes on 34 attempts for 265 yards with two touchdowns and two interceptions, including an 84-yard strike to wide receiver Emmanuel Butler in the season opener.

Statistics

Professional career

New York Giants
Cookus signed with the New York Giants as an undrafted free agent on April 28, 2020. He was waived on August 2, 2020.

Denver Broncos
On May 17, 2021, Cookus signed with the Denver Broncos, but was waived three days later on May 20.

Minnesota Vikings
On August 2, 2021, Cookus signed with the Minnesota Vikings, but was waived three days later on August 5.

Las Vegas Raiders
On August 10, 2021, Cookus signed with the Las Vegas Raiders. He was waived on August 16, 2021.

Edmonton Elks
On October 20, 2021, Cookus signed with the CFL's Edmonton Elks. He was released 5 days later.

Philadelphia Stars
Cookus was selected in the 12th round of the 2022 USFL Draft by the Philadelphia Stars.  He led the Stars into the championship game and was impressive in that game until he had to leave with a broken leg.

Los Angeles Rams
On November 23, 2022, Cookus signed with the practice squad of the Los Angeles Rams. His practice squad contract expired when the team's season ended on January 9, 2023.

Philadelphia Stars (second stint)
On February 17, 2023, Cookus re-signed with the Philadelphia Stars.

Statistics

Post Season

References

External links
 Edmonton Elks bio
 New York Giants bio
 Northern Arizona Lumberjacks bio

1995 births
Living people
People from Thousand Oaks, California
Players of American football from California
Sportspeople from Ventura County, California
American football quarterbacks
Northern Arizona Lumberjacks football players
New York Giants players
Denver Broncos players
Minnesota Vikings players
Las Vegas Raiders players
Edmonton Elks players
Philadelphia Stars (2022) players
Los Angeles Rams players